Military patrol was a team winter sport in which athletes competed in cross-country skiing, ski mountaineering and rifle shooting. It was usually contested between countries or military units. 

The military patrol competition encompassed 25 kilometer cross-country skiing (15 km for women) and rifle shooting. The size of the patrol was four members. The total climb had to be from 500 to 1200 meters (300 to 700 for women). The rules were very similar to modern biathlon. Traditionally the participating patrol had to consist of one officer, one non-commissioned officer (NCO) and two privates. The officer carried a pistol instead of a rifle and did not take part in the shooting. The total weight of the backpacks of the NCO and the privates had to be at least 24 kilograms. In later years the competitors did not carry backpacks, and the rifles were small bore rifles, similar to those in biathlon. The patrol leader did not have any kind of weapon.

Military patrol formed part of the International Military Sports Council (Conseil International du Sport Militaire, or CISM) skiing championships starting in 1929. It was in the official programme of the Winter Olympic Games in 1924 Chamonix, and on three occasions as a demonstration sport (1928, 1936 and 1948). In 1924, the military patrol team member Camille Mandrillon took the Olympic Oath on behalf of the competitors.

Successor sports
Biathlon was developed from military patrol.

Another military skiing event is the Patrouille des Glaciers, today also including competitions and rankings for civilian competitors.

See also 
 CISM Military World Games

Notes

Citations

General bibliography 
 Official Report (1924) of both Summer and Winter games:

External links
 CISM: Official rules of CISM skiing, including patrol

 
Biathlon
Cross-country skiing
Former Winter Olympic sports
Multisports
Racing
Rifle shooting sports
Ski mountaineering